The Federal District Football Association (FDFA) was first established in 1897 at a meeting at Gedye's Victoria Hotel, Cobram, Victoria for the purpose of controlling the "Cobram Courier Cup" Australian rules football competition.

History
Football teams that competed in the FDFA during its six-year history were from the following local towns in Northern Victoria – Cobram, Katamatite, Katunga, Muckatah, Strathmerton, Yarrowayah and Southern Riverina, New South Wales teams were – Barooga, Finley and Tocumwal.

This football competition only ran for six seasons from 1897 to 1902.

Premiers
1897: Muckatah
1898: Tocumwal
1899: Strathmerton
1900: Strathmerton
1901: Muckatah
1902: Cobram defeated Strathmerton

References

1897 establishments in Australia
Sports leagues established in 1897
Defunct Australian rules football competitions in Victoria (Australia)